The Canton of Pont-Audemer is a canton of the Eure département, in France.

At the French canton reorganisation which came into effect in March 2015, the canton was expanded from 14 to 26 communes:

 Appeville-Annebault
 Authou
 Bonneville-Aptot
 Brestot
 Campigny 
 Colletot 
 Condé-sur-Risle
 Corneville-sur-Risle
 Écaquelon
 Freneuse-sur-Risle
 Glos-sur-Risle
 Illeville-sur-Montfort
 Manneville-sur-Risle 
 Montfort-sur-Risle
 Le Perrey
 Pont-Audemer 
 Pont-Authou
 Les Préaux
 Saint-Mards-de-Blacarville 
 Saint-Philbert-sur-Risle
 Saint-Symphorien
 Selles 
 Thierville
 Tourville-sur-Pont-Audemer 
 Toutainville 
 Triqueville

References

Pont-Audemer